Alexander Cameron S.J. (1701 – 19 October 1746) was a Scottish nobleman, servant to Prince Charles Edward Stuart, and Roman Catholic priest in the Society of Jesus.  After travelling in Catholic Europe and the Caribbean, Cameron converted from the Non-Juring Anglican Communion to Roman Catholicism and was ordained as a priest. Fr. Cameron ran a highly successful vicariate for the still illegal and underground Catholic Church in Scotland in Lochaber and Strathglass before serving as a military chaplain to the regiment of the Jacobite Army commanded by his brother, Donald Cameron of Lochiel, during the Uprising of 1745.

After the Battle of Culloden, Fr. Cameron was captured by the British Army and died of the hardships of his imprisonment while being held without trial aboard a prison hulk anchored in the Thames River. He is currently being promoted by the Knights of St Columba for Canonization by the Roman Catholic Church.

Early life 
Alexander Cameron was born in September 1701 to John Cameron of Lochiel in Achnagarry, Scotland. He was the brother of Donald Cameron of Lochiel, who would later become the Chief of Clan Cameron and lead a regiment in the Jacobite Uprising of 1745. Alexander Cameron was raised as a Non-Juring Episcopalian, and was educated in Achnagarry.  He also attended a boarding school in St. Ninian's near Stirling.

As a young man, Cameron travelled to the West Indies on family business, but did not enjoy it. He then joined the French Army, after which he travelled throughout Europe. After arriving in the Papal States, Cameron became a servant in the household of Prince Charles Edward Stuart, heir apparent to Prince James Francis Edward Stuart, the eldest son of King James II and pretender to the English throne.

Conversion to Catholicism 
During his time in Rome, where he was "one of the Bedchamber to the Pretender in Rome", Cameron converted to Catholicism. It is noted that he was heavily influenced by Fr. John Farqhuarson S.J. and his uncle Alan Cameron, who had played a great part in the Jacobite rebellion of 1715.

During this period, Alexander Cameron wrote his brother Donald to explain his reasons for converting :″I doubt not that a piece of extraordinary news, as that of my being converted to the Catholick Faith, and quitting of the religion in which I was bred up, and educat, will at first surprise you and my Relations. I should be sorrie ever to do anything wherby I would run the risque of incurring the displeasure of a Brother whome I so much love and esteeme; but in an affaire of so great Consequence as this is, and wherupon alone my eetemall Salvation depends, my first duty is to God."Cameron's letters indicate that he understood his family would be upset with his religious conversion.  He only asked that they would still remain in contact with him. "I have seen most of the splendoure and riches of this World, and have had occasion to be in some of its most beautifull Countreys but never could find out real happiness or contentment in it: and I thank God for it, I only now can say that, I have founde reall riches in possessing nothing. I have no check of conscience and if I could with all this flatter myselfe that my Brothers and Relations had the same regard for me as formerly, my happiness would be compleate; if they have not God forgive them, I do. If I cannot have the pleasure of seeing you and liveing in the same Countrey with you, let me have the satisfaction, at a distance, of being loved by you as one Brother ought to be by an other; if we never are to meet let me at least have the pleasure of corresponding with you, and heareing from you. I have no other favoure nowe to aske of you and my Relations but the continuance of your love and affections to me as formerly; for money I neither want any at present, or ever will put you to any trouble upon that account."In another letter, Alexander Cameron tells Donald why he thinks that the Cameron clan should convert to Catholicism.  Cameron  laments that their clan had broken ties with the Catholic Church.  He reminded Donald that the penitent clan chief, Young Ewen Cameron of Lochiel, had built seven churches in Lochaber centuries before. Cameron also condemned what he called the tendency in the protestant faiths to leave religion to the ministers, rather than encouraging people to seek God themselves and seek the truth in the world around them.

Priestly Ministry 
Alexander Cameron travelled to Douai in 1730. He entered the Society of Jesus at Tournai on 30 September 1734 and took his first vows on 1 October 1736. He was ordained a Priest in 1740, and returned to Scotland in June 1741.

Reports indicated that Cameron was very successful in his mission to the highland vicariate . In a report to their General Assembly, the local Presbyterian ministers noted that Cameron, who "hath lately setled in the part of Strathglass that pertains to Lord Lovet, and is employed as a Poppish Missionary in that neighbourhood and Glenstrathfarrar, and trafficks with great success; and he hath great advantage by his connection with the inhabitants of Lochaber."

Cameron lived in the vicariate with two other Jesuits: Fr. John Farqhuarson, who had influenced his conversion, and Fr. Charles Farqhuarson,  John's brother. Dom. Odo Blundell of Fort Augustus Abbey stated that the priests' residence was located under the cliff of a big boulder at Brae of Craskie in Glenannich. This dwelling was the very centre of the Catholic mission in Lochaber at the time, where Cameron secretly ministered to the local Catholics.

Cameron almost died at this residence due to its coldness. Cameron refused to retreat to Beaufort Castle because he wanted to minister to the people of Glenannich throughout the winter. Lord Lovat, himself a Catholic, wrote to Donald Cameron, begging him to order his brother to the castle, where Lovat would "furnish him with all the conveniences of Life". Cameron refused to go.

Lovat frequently provided supplies for Cameron and the other local priests at Mass-houses that Lovat provided in Crochail and Strathfarrar. However, the Presbytery of Inverness eventually forced Lovat had to close them.

Capture and death 
In 1745, Cameron enlisted as a chaplain to Donald Cameron of Lochiel's Regiment. The regiment had three chaplains (a Presbyterian minister, a Non-juring Episcopalian clergyman, and a Catholic). On the evening before the Battle of Culloden, Fr. Cameron offered the Tridentine Mass on the battlefield for his regiment, wearing a tartan chasuble – a fragment of which is preserved today.

After the Jacobite defeat at Culloden, Cameron fled to escape the British Army. However, he was captured at Morar, taken in captivity by Captain Ferguson, and later transferred with Fr. James Grant and other priests to HMS Furnace, a prison hulk. Reports are that Ferguson "brutalised" Cameron, placing him in iron chains among the ropes and cables of the Furnace.

Cameron became seriously ill as a result of his imprisonment. After seeing a doctor's report, Lord Albemarle ordered Fr. Cameron taken ashore. Captain Ferguson ignored his command. Some others tried to prepared proper bedding for Fr. Cameron, to which Ferguson replied that he would sink this boat and theirs if anyone dared to aid Fr. Cameron.

After the Furnace had anchored in the Thames, Fr. Cameron died, with Fr. John Farquharson by his side. Fr. Cameron was buried in the nearest cemetery to the ship.

Devotion and canonisation 
The Knights of St. Columba at the University of Glasgow have launched a campaign to canonize Fr. Cameron, "with the hope that he will become a great saint for Scotland and that our nation will merit from his intercession." They erected a small petition book at their altar of St. Joseph in the University Catholic Chapel, Turnbull Hall. It is one of the necessary prerequisites for Canonisation in the Roman Catholic Church that there is a Cult of Devotion to the saint.

The Knights distributed prayer cards for Cameron. It reads:O God, who will that every nation and people be converted unto you, you gave us Father Alexander Cameron as a preacher of the gospel, so that Scotland may once again love the Faith entire and true.

May his example of humble ministry in the midst of greater danger stir up in us a zeal for the Gospel. May his capturing, enduring of torture, suffering and death be an example witness to the one true faith, so that by imitating his courage we might surrender to the Divine Will.

Through his intercession, hear our petitions for the conversion of Scotland and for the conversion of our own hearts, so that brought to closer unity with you, we may more faithfully contemplate the truth and show forth the fruits of that contemplation.

Father Alexander, please pray for this particular intention.

Heavenly Father, grant that Father Alexander may be deemed worthy of canonisation, so that we may merit from his intercession, for the glory of your Church, the praise of the Blessed Virgin Mary, and the evangelisation of our nation. Amen.The image of Cameron is from a tapestry commissioned by the Lord Marquess of Bute entitled "The Prayer for Victory" by William Skeoch Cummings.  The tapestry depicts the Jacobite army kneeling in prayer before the Battle of Prestonpans. Cameron is shown genuflecting in the foreground.

References

See also

Patrick Hamilton (martyr)
George Wishart
List of Protestant martyrs of the Scottish Reformation
Forty Martyrs of England and Wales
List of Catholic martyrs of the English Reformation
Saint John Ogilvie
John Black (martyr)
George Douglas (martyr)
William Gibson (martyr)
Patrick Primrose
Hugh Barclay of Ladyland, David Graham, Laird of Fintry,  Spanish blanks plot

1701 births
1746 deaths
Clan Cameron
Converts to Roman Catholicism from Anglicanism
People from Lochaber
People of the Jacobite rising of 1745
Scottish Catholic martyrs
Scottish Jesuits
Scottish Roman Catholic priests
Scottish Roman Catholics
Scottish soldiers
Scottish torture victims
Torture in Scotland
Venerated Catholics